The Saskatchewan Rush are a lacrosse team based in Saskatoon, Saskatchewan playing in the National Lacrosse League (NLL). The 2022 season is the 16th in franchise history, 6th in Saskatchewan.

Current standings

Game log

Regular season
Reference:

Current roster

Entry draft
The 2021 NLL Entry Draft took place on August 28, 2021. The Rush made the following selections:

See also
2022 NLL season

References

Saskatchewan Rush
Saskatchewan Rush seasons
Saskatchewan Rush